Stylommatophora is an order of air-breathing land snails and slugs, terrestrial pulmonate gastropod molluscs. This taxon includes most land snails and slugs.

The two strong synapomorphies of Stylommatophora are a long pedal gland placed beneath a membrane and two pairs of retractile tentacles (Dayrat & Tillier).

Several families in this group contain species of snails and slugs that create love darts.

Stylommatophora are known from the Cretaceous period up to the present day.

2005 taxonomy
According to the taxonomy of the Gastropoda by Bouchet & Rocroi (2005) based on evolutionary ancestry is the clade Stylommatophora in clade Eupulmonata within informal group Pulmonata. It uses unranked clades for taxa above the rank of superfamily (replacing the ranks suborder, order, superorder and subclass) and the traditional Linnaean approach for all taxa below the rank of superfamily.

The clade Stylommatophora contains the subclades Elasmognatha, Orthurethra and the informal group Sigmurethra. The term "informal group" has been used to indicate whenever monophyly has not been tested, or where a traditional taxon of gastropods has now been discovered to be paraphyletic or polyphyletic.

clade Elasmognatha
 Superfamily Succineoidea
 Superfamily Athoracophoroidea

clade Orthurethra
 Superfamily Partuloidea
 Superfamily Achatinelloidea
 Superfamily Cochlicopoidea
 Superfamily Pupilloidea
 Superfamily Enoidea

informal group Sigmurethra
 Superfamily Clausilioidea
 Superfamily Orthalicoidea
 Superfamily Achatinoidea
 Superfamily Aillyoidea
 Superfamily Testacelloidea
 Superfamily Papillodermatoidea
 Superfamily Streptaxoidea
 Superfamily Rhytidoidea
 Superfamily Acavoidea
 Superfamily Punctoidea
 Superfamily Sagdoidea

"limacoid clade" (within the Sigmurethra)
 Superfamily Staffordioidea
 Superfamily Dyakioidea
 Superfamily Gastrodontoidea
 Superfamily Parmacelloidea
 Superfamily Zonitoidea
 Superfamily Helicarionoidea
 Superfamily Limacoidea

(not in limacoid clade, but is within the Sigmurethra)
 Superfamily Arionoidea
 Superfamily Helicoidea

Previous taxonomy
Subinfraorder Orthurethra
Superfamily Achatinelloidea Gulick, 1873
Superfamily Cochlicopoidea Pilsbry, 1900
Superfamily Partuloidea Pilsbry, 1900
Superfamily Pupilloidea Turton, 1831
Subinfraorder Sigmurethra
Superfamily Acavoidea Pilsbry, 1895
Superfamily Achatinoidea Swainson, 1840
Superfamily Aillyoidea Baker, 1960
Superfamily Arionoidea J.E. Gray in Turnton, 1840
Superfamily Buliminoidea Clessin, 1879
Superfamily Camaenoidea Pilsbry, 1895
Superfamily Clausilioidea Mörch, 1864
Superfamily Dyakioidea Gude & Woodward, 1921
Superfamily Gastrodontoidea Tryon, 1866
Superfamily Helicoidea Rafinesque, 1815
Superfamily Helixarionoidea Bourguignat, 1877 
Superfamily Limacoidea Rafinesque, 1815
Superfamily Oleacinoidea H. & A. Adams, 1855
Superfamily Orthalicoidea Albers-Martens, 1860 
Superfamily Plectopylidoidea Moellendorf, 1900
Superfamily Polygyroidea Pilsbry, 1894
Superfamily Punctoidea Morse, 1864
Superfamily Rhytidoidea Pilsbry, 1893
Superfamily Sagdidoidera Pilsbry, 1895
Superfamily Staffordioidea Thiele, 1931
Superfamily Streptaxoidea J.E. Gray, 1806
Superfamily Strophocheiloidea Thiele, 1926
Superfamily Trigonochlamydoidea Hese, 1882
Superfamily Zonitoidea Mörch, 1864

References

 
Extant Cretaceous first appearances